"Steal My Love" is a song by American country pop duo Dan + Shay. It was released as the fourth single from their fourth studio album, Good Things, on August 16, 2021. Duo-member Dan Smyers wrote the song with Ashley Gorley, Andy Albert and Jordan Reynolds, and produced it.

Content
Sutton Reekes of Nicki Swift explained that "Steal My Love" is "overtly about love and relationships." Duo sang in the lyrics: "My car, my clothes, my money. Take it all but there ain't nobody gonna steal my love." This lyrics is alluding to their wives.

Music video
The music video was released on August 17, 2021, and directed Patrick Tracy. It was filmed in Springfield, Tennessee. The video stars the duo as bank robbers, trying to steal a mysterious briefcase which is locked inside a vault. Later, they safely get the briefcase before it can be stolen by other robbers. Subsequently they "lead the bad guys on a chase through town" and dance on the street.

Commercial performance
After the album was released, the song debut at number 98 on the Billboard Hot 100 and number 26 on the Billboard Hot Country Songs. Upon its release as a single, it peaked at number 28 on the Billboard Country Airplay chart in March 2022, becoming the duo's lowest-charting single since "Road Trippin'" peaked at number 42 in 2017.

Credits and personnel

Dan + Shay

 Dan Smyers - vocals, production, songwriting, programming
 Shay Mooney - vocals, songwriting

Charts

Weekly charts

Year-end charts

References

2021 singles
2021 songs
Dan + Shay songs
Songs written by Dan Smyers
Songs written by Ashley Gorley
Songs written by Andy Albert
Songs written by Jordan Reynolds
Country ballads
Warner Records Nashville singles